Euan Deveney (born 16 November 2002) is a Northern Irish footballer who plays as a defender.

Club career
Deveney played for Rangers at youth level before joining Kilmarnock in 2018. He signed his first professional contract with the club in August 2019, and made his first team debut on 13 August 2020 during a 3–0 defeat to Dunfermline Athletic in the Scottish League Cup.

He joined Falkirk on a season-long loan on 23 October 2020.

International career
Deveney played for Northern Ireland at under-19 level.

References

External links

2002 births
Living people
Association footballers from Northern Ireland
Northern Ireland youth international footballers
Association football defenders
Kilmarnock F.C. players
Falkirk F.C. players
Airdrieonians F.C. players